The 1999 Evert Cup was a WTA tennis tournament, played on outdoor hard courts.

Players

Seeds

  Vanessa Menga /  Elena Wagner (champions)
  Eugenia Kulikovskaya /  Marlene Weingärtner (qualifying competition)

Qualifiers
  Vanessa Menga /  Elena Wagner

Qualifying draw

References
 1999 Lipton Championships Qualifying Draw

Women's Doubles Qualifying
Lipton Championships